Valley Township is one of the nineteen townships of Guernsey County, Ohio, United States. As of the 2010 census the population was 2,263, of whom 1,816 lived in the unincorporated portion.

Geography
Located in the southern part of the county, it borders the following townships:
Jackson Township - north
Richland Township - east
Buffalo Township, Noble County - south
Spencer Township - west

The village of Pleasant City is located in central Valley Township. As well, two unincorporated communities lie in the township: Buffalo in the east, and Derwent at its center.

Name and history
Valley Township was organized in 1815. Statewide, the only other Valley Township is located in Scioto County.

Government
The township is governed by a three-member board of trustees, who are elected in November of odd-numbered years to a four-year term beginning on the following January 1. Two are elected in the year after the presidential election and one is elected in the year before it. There is also an elected township fiscal officer, who serves a four-year term beginning on April 1 of the year after the election, which is held in November of the year before the presidential election. Vacancies in the fiscal officership or on the board of trustees are filled by the remaining trustees.

References

External links
County website

Townships in Guernsey County, Ohio
Townships in Ohio